Dunlop Tournament may refer a number of different golf tournaments sponsored by Dunlop:

 Dunlop Tournament (United Kingdom) (1949–1961), previously called the Dunlop-Southport Tournament
 Dunlop Tournament (Japan) (1969–1976), currently called the Diamond Cup Golf Tournament
 Dunlop-Southport Tournament, in Britain, from 1931 to 1948
 Dunlop-Metropolitan Tournament, in Britain, from 1934 to 1939
 Dunlop Masters, in Britain, from 1946 to 1983
 Dunlop South African Masters, from 1960 to 1977
 Dunlop International, in Australia, from 1965 to 1972
 Dunlop Phoenix Tournament, in Japan, since 1974
 Dunlop International Open, in Japan, from 1977 to 1987
 becoming the Dunlop Open from 1988 to 1995
 Dunlop Srixon Fukushima Open, in Japan, since 2014
 Irish Dunlop Tournament, in Ireland, until 1980
 Lusaka Open, in Zambia
 sponsored as the Lusaka Dunlop Open in 1970 and 1971
 Malaysian Dunlop Masters, in Malaysia, during the 1970s
 Rhodesian Dunlop Masters, in Rhodesia (now Zimbabwe), from 1969 to 1978

See also
 Dunlop Cup (disambiguation)
 Dunlop Wizard